The Third Konoe Cabinet is the 39th Cabinet of Japan led by Fumimaro Konoe from July 18, 1941, to October 18, 1941.

Cabinet

References 

Cabinet of Japan
1941 establishments in Japan
Cabinets established in 1941
Cabinets disestablished in 1941